Saint-Christophe-sur-Condé (literally Saint-Christophe on Condé) is a commune in the Eure department in Normandy in northern France.

Population

See also
Communes of the Eure department

References

Communes of Eure